Soghan District is a district (bakhsh) in Arzuiyeh County, Kerman Province, Iran. At the 2006 census, its population was 9,749, in 2,050 families. The district has no cities. The district has one rural district (dehestan): Soghan Rural District.

References 

Arzuiyeh County
Districts of Kerman Province